Ro-110 was an Imperial Japanese Navy Ro-100-class submarine. Completed and commissioned in July 1943, she served in World War II, operating in the Indian Ocean. She was sunk in February 1944 during her third war patrol.

Design and description
The Ro-100 class was a medium-sized, coastal submarine derived from the preceding Kaichū type. They displaced  surfaced and  submerged.

For surface running, the boats were powered by two  diesel engines, each driving one propeller shaft. When submerged each propeller was driven by a  electric motor. They could reach  on the surface and  underwater.

The boats were armed with four internal bow  torpedo tubes and carried a total of eight torpedoes. They were also armed with two single mounts for  Type 96 anti-aircraft guns or a single  L/40 AA gun.

Construction and commissioning

Ro-110 was laid down as Submarine No. 401 on 20 August 1942 by the Kawasaki at Kobe, Japan. She had been renamed Ro-110 by the time she was launched on 26 January 1943. She was completed and commissioned on 6 July 1943.

Service history

July–November 1943
Upon commissioning, Ro-110 was attached to the Sasebo Naval District. She was reassigned to Submarine Squadron 11 on 10 July 1943. On 10 November 1943 she was reassigned to Submarine Division 30 in Submarine Squadron 8 in the Southwest Area Fleet, and she departed Sasebo, Japan, that day and moved to Tachibana Bay on the coast of Kyushu. On 12 November 1944 she got underway from Tachibana Bay bound for Penang in Japanese-occupied British Malaya, which she reached on 24 November 1943.

First war patrol
On 3 December 1943, Ro-110 departed Penang to begin her first war patrol, tasked with raiding Allied shipping in the Indian Ocean. She attacked an Allied convoy in the Bay of Bengal southeast of Madras, India, on 14 December 1943 with a spread of torpedoes, damaging one ship. Another ship rammed her, wrecking one of her periscopes and the roof of her conning tower. The damage forced her to head back to Penang, where she arrived on 19 December 1943 and her commanding officer claimed to have sunk one ship.

Daisy Moller, which had left Bombay, India, on 27 November 1943 with a cargo of war materials including ammunition, had made a brief stop at Colombo, Ceylon, before getting back underway on 8 December to complete her voyage by steaming independently to Chittagong, India. The submarine′s crew then machine-gunned the survivors in the water before also machine gunning the men aboard the life rafts. Sources disagree on the number of casualties. Other sources claim her crew totaled as many as 127 and that only 14 survived. Ro-110′s log claimed that she never surfaced during her attack on the convoy, and whether she was the submarine which attacked Daisy Moller′s survivors is a matter of controversy.

Second war patrol

During her stay at Penang, Ro-110 was reassigned to Submarine Division 30 in Submarine Squadron 8 in the 6th Fleet on 1 January 1944. On 2 January 1944, she put to sea to conduct her second war patrol in the Indian Ocean. It was uneventful, and she returned to Penang later in January 1944.

Third war patrol

Ro-110 again left Penang on 2 February 1944 to begin her third war patrol, assigned a patrol area in the Bay of Bengal. After she departed Penang, the Japanese never heard from her again.

Loss

She scored two torpedo hits on the British 6,274-gross register ton merchant ship Asphalion. The torpedoes left six members of Asphalion′s crew missing and ten injured and flooded her No. 3 hold and engine room, crippling her.

Meanwhile, the convoy's escorts counterattacked. The Royal Indian Navy sloop  and the Royal Australian Navy corvettes  and  gained sonar contact on Ro-110 and attacked her with depth charges.

On 15 March 1944, the Imperial Japanese Navy declared Ro-110 to be presumed lost with all 47 men on board. The Japanese struck her from the Navy list on 30 April 1944.

Notes

References
 

 

1943 ships
Ships built by Kawasaki Heavy Industries
World War II submarines of Japan
Japanese submarines lost during World War II
Ro-100-class submarines
Ships lost with all hands
Maritime incidents in February 1944
World War II shipwrecks in the Indian Ocean
Submarines sunk by Australian warships
Japanese war crimes